Steve Junker (born June 26, 1972) is a Canadian former professional ice hockey player. He was drafted by the New York Islanders with the 92nd pick in the 1991 NHL Entry Draft. He played in only five NHL regular-season games plus three playoff games between the 1992–93 and 1993–94 seasons, where he recorded his only NHL point. The rest of his career, which lasted from 1992 to 2010, was mainly spent in the Deutsche Eishockey Liga.

On April 27, 2010, Junker was named head coach and general manager of the KIJHL's Castlegar Rebels; he held the roles for one year.

Career statistics

Regular season and playoffs

International

External links
 

1972 births
Living people
Adler Mannheim players
Augsburger Panther players
Canadian ice hockey right wingers
Capital District Islanders players
Denver Grizzlies players
Detroit Vipers players
EV Landshut players
Ice hockey people from British Columbia
Los Angeles Ice Dogs players
New York Islanders draft picks
New York Islanders players
Rochester Americans players
Salt Lake Golden Eagles (IHL) players
Schwenninger Wild Wings players
Spokane Chiefs players
Sportspeople from Castlegar, British Columbia